Hache is a Spanish crime drama streaming television series created by Verónica Fernández. The series is set in the world of drug trafficking in the Barcelona of the 60s, and it stars Adriana Ugarte, along with Eduardo Noriega, and Javier Rey. The first season is composed of 8 episodes of one hour, and became available for streaming worldwide on Netflix on 1 November 2019. On 21 November 2019 it was confirmed that the series had been renewed for a second season, which premiered on 5 February 2021. In July 2021, the series was canceled after two seasons.

Cast

Episodes

Season 1 (2019)

Season 2

Awards and nominations 

|-
| align = "center" rowspan = 2 | 2021 || rowspan = "2" | 8th  || colspan = "2" | Best Drama Series ||  || rowspan = 2" | 
|-
| Best Drama Actor || Javier Rey || 
|}

References

External links 
 
 

Spanish-language Netflix original programming
2019 Spanish television series debuts
Spanish crime television series
Prostitution in television
Television shows set in Barcelona
Television series about illegal drug trade
Television series set in the 1960s
2010s Spanish drama television series
2020s Spanish drama television series